Libellus de Nativitate Sanctae Mariae (literally book of the birth of Saint Mary) is a text concerning the events surrounding the birth of Mary, mother of Jesus. It essentially originates as part of the Gospel of Pseudo-Matthew, and was treated as an independent work around the ninth century.

See also
List of Gospels

References

Mary, Nativity of